The 2021 season for  was the 18th season in the team's existence, the 11th as a UCI ProTeam, and the third under the current name.

Team roster 

Riders who joined the team for the 2021 season

Riders who left the team during or after the 2021 season

Season victories

References

External links 

 

Arkéa–Samsic men
2021
Arkéa–Samsic men